Purna Dam, is an earthfill dam on Purna river near Amravati in the state of Maharashtra in India.

Specifications

Purpose
 Irrigation
 Hydroelectricity
 Water supply

See also
 Dams in Maharashtra
 List of reservoirs and dams in India

References

Dams in Amravati district
Dams completed in 2006
2006 establishments in Maharashtra